The long-billed thrush (Zoothera monticola) is a species of bird in the family Turdidae. It is found from the Himalayas to Myanmar and Vietnam. Its natural habitat is subtropical or tropical moist montane forests.

Gallery

References

long-billed thrush
Birds of North India
Birds of Nepal
Birds of Bhutan
Birds of Northeast India
Birds of Myanmar
Birds of Vietnam
long-billed thrush
Taxonomy articles created by Polbot